Moncoutant-sur-Sèvre is a commune in the Deux-Sèvres department in western France.

It was established on 1 January 2019 by merger of the former communes of Moncoutant (the seat), Le Breuil-Bernard, La Chapelle-Saint-Étienne, Moutiers-sous-Chantemerle, Pugny and Saint-Jouin-de-Milly.

Population

See also
Communes of the Deux-Sèvres department

References

Communes of Deux-Sèvres
States and territories established in 2019